Charity Majors is an American software engineer and technology entrepreneur. She is the cofounder and CTO of Honeycomb, which makes code observability software. She was previously an engineer at Parse and Facebook.

References

External links
 Charity.WTF (personal blog)
 Honeycomb.io

Living people
Year of birth missing (living people)
Place of birth missing (living people)
American software engineers
American women business executives
American technology executives
Facebook employees
21st-century American women